South Carolina Highway 37 (SC 37) is a  primary state highway in the U.S. state of South Carolina. It provides a direct route between Barnwell and Springfield.

Route description
SC 37 is a two-lane rural highway that travels between U.S. Route 278 (US 278) and SC 39, with a connection with US 78 in Elko.

History
SC 37 is an original state highway, established in 1922. Its original routing was from SC 1, in Barnwell, to SC 27, in Williston. In 1923, SC 37 was rerouted to Elko, leaving behind Williston Way (S-6-113). In 1940, SC 37 was extended in both directions: north to SC 39; south through Barnwell, in concurrency with SC 3, to the Barnwell-Allendale county line. By 1942, a separate section of SC 37 was established on primary routing from SC 73/SC 631, southeast of Allendale, to north of SC 28, in Baldock. In 1948, SC 37 was truncated to US 78, in Elko; but in the following year, it was re-extended back to SC 39. In 1962 or 1963, SC 37 was truncated at its current southern terminus with SC 28, north of Barnwell; its former alignment south replaced by SC 3.

Junction list

See also

References

External links

 
 Mapmikey's South Carolina Highways Page: SC 30-39

037
Transportation in Barnwell County, South Carolina